La Academia de Esperanza (LADE) is a charter school in Albuquerque, New Mexico. LADE has two campuses: one at the Desert Hills Treatment Center and the other campus in Albuquerque's South Valley at the intersection of Coors and Old Coors. La Academia de Esperanza has a charter through Albuquerque Public Schools.

La Academia de Esperanza was founded in 2003 to serve "the growing population of 'at risk' youth" in Albuquerque.

According to the school's website: "La Academia de Esperanza provides quality academic and vocational learning for students ages 11 to 18 in preparation for their roles as socially responsible individuals, within a community-based, ethnically and culturally-sensitive educational environment."

References

Schools in New Mexico
Education in Albuquerque, New Mexico